Mohammad Tarif (born 19 October 1946) is an Indian cricketer. He played in 60 first-class matches from 1964/65 to 1982/83. His sons Mohammad Kaif and Mohammad Saif also played cricket.

See also
 List of Uttar Pradesh cricketers

References

External links
 

1946 births
Living people
Indian cricketers
Railways cricketers
Uttar Pradesh cricketers
Cricketers from Allahabad